South Kansas and Oklahoma Railroad  is a short line railroad which operates  of rail lines in Kansas, Oklahoma and Missouri that used to belong to Missouri Pacific, Frisco and Santa Fe lines. SKOL is a unit of Watco. The present railroad was created in July 2000, when Watco merged one short line railroad, the Southeast Kansas Railroad (SEKR), with another short line, the South Kansas and Oklahoma Railroad. SKOL was the surviving company.

Rail lines of the present SKOL include:
 Tulsa, Oklahoma to Humboldt, Kansas,
 Cherryvale, Kansas to Oxford, Kansas,
 Cherryvale to Sherwin, Kansas to Liberal, Missouri,
 Cherryvale to Coffeyville, Kansas, 
 Sherwin to Columbus, Kansas,
 Owasso, Oklahoma to Catoosa, Oklahoma and Tulsa Ports. 

The only part of the former SEKR system that still operates is Sherwin to Liberal.

SKOL was honored as Regional Railroad of the Year for 2008 by rail industry magazine Railway Age.

SKOL has Class I railroad interchanges with the BNSF, Kansas City Southern, and Union Pacific.

References

External links
 

South Kansas & Oklahoma Railroad
Union Pacific - Short Line Railroads - South Kansas & Oklahoma Railroad SKOL

Kansas railroads
Missouri railroads
Oklahoma railroads
Regional railroads in the United States
Watco
Spin-offs of the Atchison, Topeka and Santa Fe Railway